Crypthonia lichexanthonica is a species of crustose and corticolous (bark-dwelling) lichen in the family Arthoniaceae. Found in Brazil, it was formally described as a new species in 2013 by Aline Anjos Menezes, Marcela Eugenia da Silva Cáceres, and André Aptroot. Here, in Caatinga forest, it was found growing on the smooth bark of a tree. Crypthonia lichexanthonica is the only species in its genus to contain lichexanthone, a secondary chemical that causes the lichen to fluoresce yellow when shone with a UV light.

References

Arthoniomycetes
Lichen species
Lichens described in 2013
Lichens of Northeast Brazil
Taxa named by André Aptroot
Taxa named by Marcela Cáceres